Harri Hawkins (born 28 February 1993) is an English professional footballer who plays as a defender for Recreativo.

Career
Hawkins played with Histon in both the National League and the National League North between 2011 and 2013, before heading to the United States to play college soccer at Hofstra University. Hawkins was ineligible to play during the 2013 season, but made 59 appearances and tallied 2 goals and 1 assist between 2014 and 2016.

While at college, Hawkins played with Premier Development League sides Long Island Rough Riders and Ventura County Fusion.

After going undrafted in the 2017 MLS SuperDraft, Hawkins joined National Premier Soccer League side New York Cosmos B. On 26 August 2017, Hawkins signed with the club's first team who play in the North American Soccer League.

Hawkins signed with Loudoun United on February 22, 2019. He scored his first goal for Loudoun on August 9, 2019, in Segra Field's opener. His goal was also Loudoun's first goal in Segra Field.

Hawkins joined Greenville Triumph SC in USL League One ahead of the 2020 season. Hawkins was released by Greenville following their 2020 season.

On 12 August 2021, Hawkins joined Tercera División RFEF side Recreativo.

References

External links
 
 Penn FC profile
 Cosmos profile

1993 births
Living people
Association football defenders
English expatriate footballers
English footballers
Expatriate soccer players in the United States
Hofstra Pride men's soccer players
Long Island Rough Riders players
Ventura County Fusion players
New York Cosmos B players
New York Cosmos (2010) players
Penn FC players
Loudoun United FC players
Greenville Triumph SC players
USL League One players
USL League Two players
North American Soccer League players
English expatriate sportspeople in the United States
Expatriate footballers in Spain
English expatriate sportspeople in Spain
Recreativo de Huelva players